Monomorium latinode, is a species of ant of the subfamily Myrmicinae. It is found in many Asian countries.

References

External links

 at antwiki.org
Animaldiversity.org
Ants of Africa
It is.org

latinode
Hymenoptera of Asia